John Dirk Walecka, often quoted as J. Dirk Walecka (born March 11, 1932) is an American theoretical nuclear and particle physicist. He is a fellow of the American Physical Society and the author of numerous textbooks in physics. Walecka is currently the Governor's Distinguished CEBAF Professor of Physics, Emeritus at the College of William and Mary.

Life
Walecka studied at Harvard University as an undergraduate, reviving a Bachelor of Arts in 1954, and received his doctorate in 1958 under Victor Weisskopf at the Massachusetts Institute of Technology. Walecka moved to Stanford University in 1959, where he was made Assistant Professor in 1960, upon completing his NSF fellowship, and Professor in 1966. From 1977 to 1982 he was head of the physics faculty and from 1987 he holds the title of Emeritus Professor of Physics. From 1986 to 1992 he was the scientific director of the Continuous Electron Beam Accelerator Facility (CEBAF) in Newport News, Virginia. From 1992 he was the Distinguished CEBAF Professor of Physics at the College of William and Mary, where he headed the Nuclear Physics Institute and the Physics Faculty. In 1991 he served as the Distinguished Ship Lecturer at Stanford. Also from 1992 he worked at the Thomas Jefferson National Accelerator Facility.

Walecka is the author of a standard work on quantum mechanical many-body theory with Alexander Fetter and a book on many-body methods in theoretical nuclear physics. He was particularly concerned with electron scattering on nuclei. In 2000 he edited Felix Bloch's lectures on statistical mechanics (World Scientific).

Awards
Walecka has been a fellow of the American Physical Society since 1971. and was a fellow of the National Science Foundation from 1958 through 1960, while at CERN and then Stanford.

In 1996 Walecka received the Tom W. Bonner Prize in Nuclear Physics. for "his preeminent theoretical guidance and inspirational leadership in exploiting electromagnetic and weak probes of the nucleus and for his fundamental contributions to the understanding of the nucleus as a relativistic quantum many-body system."

In 2009 he received the Eugene Feenberg Memorial Medal "for theoretical contributions in electroweak interactions with nuclei, the development of relativistic field theories of the nuclear many-body problem and unparalleled achievements in the education of a generation of young nuclear many-body physicists".

Publications
 Theoretical nuclear and subnuclear physics, Oxford University Press 1996
 with Alexander L. Fetter: Quantum theory of many particle systems, McGraw Hill 1971, Dover 2006
 with Fetter: Theoretical mechanics of particles and continua, McGraw Hill 1980, Dover 2003
 with Fetter: Nonlinear Mechanics, Dover 2006
 Introduction to General Relativity, World Scientific 2007
 Introduction to Modern Physics - Theoretical Foundations, World Scientific 2008
 Electron scattering for nuclei and nucleon structure, Cambridge University Press 2001
 
 Advanced Modern Physics, World Scientific Publishing, 2010
 Topics in Modern Physics: Theoretical Foundations, World Scientific Publishing, 2013
 Introduction to Electricity and Magnetism, World Scientific Publishing, 2018
Introduction to Classical Mechanics, World Scientific Publishing, 2020
Introduction to Quantum Mechanics, World Scientific Publishing, 2021

References

Further reading
 Warren Buck, Khin Maung, Brian Serot (Eds.) Dirkfest 92: A symposium in honor of J. Dirk Walecka (CEBAF April 1992), World Scientific 1992

External links
 
 
 

Stanford University faculty
College of William & Mary faculty
Harvard College alumni
Massachusetts Institute of Technology alumni
1932 births
Living people
Theoretical physicists
American nuclear physicists
Particle physicists
Fellows of the American Physical Society
American textbook writers
People associated with CERN
Accelerator physicists